Howard Rosenman (born February 1, 1945), also known as Zvi Howard Rosenman, is an American producer and motion picture executive. He specializes in producing romantic comedy films and documentary films. Some of his most popular productions include Father of the Bride (1991) starring Steve Martin and Diane Keaton, Joss Whedon's Buffy the Vampire Slayer (1992) and The Family Man (2000) starring Nicolas Cage.  Rosenman's documentary film Common Threads: Stories from the Quilt won the Peabody Award and the 1990 Academy Award for Best Documentary Feature; his film The Celluloid Closet also won the Peabody Award.

Life and career 
Rosenman was born in Brooklyn, New York and grew up in Far Rockaway, Queens, the son of Sima (née Rosenfeld) and Morris Joseph Rosenman, Ashkenazi Jewish parents from Israel whose families had lived in the Old City of Jerusalem and Mea Shearim for seven generations, but immigrated to the United States in the wake of Arab pogroms. Rosenman graduated from Brooklyn College with a degree in European Literature in 1965. In 1967, he took a leave from medical school at Hahnemann Medical College to serve as an extern medic in the Six-Day War as a part of the Israeli Defense Forces.  After the war, he met his mentor, the composer Leonard Bernstein, who encouraged him to leave medical school after two years and begin his career in show business.  Rosenman's first job was on Broadway assisting Katharine Hepburn in the André Previn musical Coco in 1969.  Also, on Broadway, he assisted the director, Sir Michael Benthall (former head of Britain's National Theatre/Old Vic), on I'm Solomon and Her First Roman.  He then became a producer of commercials for the ad agency Benton & Bowles, winning two Clio Awards on campaigns for Cool Whip and Almond Joy.

For his first feature film Sparkle, he served as its producer and collaborated with Joel Schumacher on its story. With producing partner Renée Missel, Rosenman went on to make the film The Main Event starring Barbra Streisand and Ryan O'Neal and  Resurrection starring Ellen Burstyn and Sam Shepard. Resurrection received two Academy Award nominations.

He served as Co-President of Production at Sandollar, manager Sandy Gallin's and performer Dolly Parton's production company, from 1985–1992. While co-heading production at Sandollar with producer Carol Baum, he produced Father of the Bride, Buffy the Vampire Slayer, Gross Anatomy starring Matthew Modine (about Rosenman's years in medical school), Straight Talk starring Dolly Parton, Sidney Lumet's A Stranger Among Us, Shining Through starring Melanie Griffith and Michael Douglas, and Harvey Fierstein's Tidy Endings for HBO, which garnered two Emmy Award nominations and two CableACE Awards.

Also during this time, Rosenman served as Executive Producer of the Oscar-winning Common Threads: Stories from the Quilt by Rob Epstein and Jeffrey Friedman. Rosenman collaborated with Epstein and Friedman on two more documentary films: The Celluloid Closet in 1995, which was nominated for four Emmy Awards, and Paragraph 175 in 2000.

He served as President of Production at Brillstein-Grey Entertainment from 1992–1994.  While at Brillstein-Grey Entertainment, he oversaw initial development of The Cable Guy starring Jim Carrey and Mike Nichols's What Planet Are You From?.

He subsequently formed Howard Rosenman Productions and produced The Family Man, Noel starring Susan Sarandon, Penélope Cruz and Robin Williams and You Kill Me starring Sir Ben Kingsley and Téa Leoni.

In 2007, Rosenman was the Executive Producer on the David Milch surfing series John from Cincinnati for HBO.

Rosenman made his acting debut in Gus Van Sant's Milk playing the role of David Goodstein (founder of The Advocate) opposite Sean Penn as Harvey Milk.

Rosenman is Co-Founder of Project Angel Food in Los Angeles, a meals-on-wheels program for people living with life-threatening diseases including AIDS and cancer.

Filmography 
He was a producer in all films unless otherwise noted.

Film 

As an actor

As writer

Television

References

External links 

 Howard Rosenman at filmreference.com
 Howard Rosenman at movies.nytimes.com

1945 births
Living people
Film producers from New York (state)
20th-century American Jews
LGBT Jews
LGBT people from New York (state)
Brooklyn College alumni
People from Brooklyn
People from Far Rockaway, Queens
21st-century American Jews